Tacquet is a small, bowl-shaped crater that lies near the southern edge of Mare Serenitatis, in the northeast part of the Moon. The surface near the crater is marked by high-albedo ejecta. To the west is a system of rilles designated the Rimae Menelaus. Its diameter is 6.4 km. It was named after Brabantian mathematician André Tacquet (1612-1660).

Satellite craters

By convention these features are identified on lunar maps by placing the letter on the side of the crater midpoint that is closest to Tacquet.

The following craters have been renamed by the IAU.

 Tacquet A — See Al-Bakri (crater).

References

 
 
 
 
 
 
 
 
 
 
 

Impact craters on the Moon